Dr. Adolf Spilker was a German fishing trawler that was requisitioned by the Kriegsmarine in the Second World War for use as a Vorpostenboot, serving as V 401 Dr. Adolf Spilker and V 402 Dr. Adolf Spilker. She was scuttled at Bayonne, France in August 1944.

Description
The engine was built by Christiansen & Meyer, Harburg, Germany and was rated at 70nhp. It drove a single screw propeller.

History
Dr. Adolf Spilker was built as yard number 261 by Schiffbau-Gesellschaft Unterweser AG, Wesermünde, Germany. She was launched on 22 August 1936 and completed on 22 September. She was built for F. Busse, Wesermünde. The Code Letters DFCN were allocated, as was the fishing boat registration PG 502.

On 16 September 1939, she was requisitioned by the Kriegsmarine and commissioned with 4 Vorpostenflotille as the Vorpostenboot V 401 Dr. Adolf Spilker. On 16 October 1944, she was redesignated V 402 Dr. Adolf Spilker. She was scuttled as a blockship at Bayonne, Basses-Pyrénées, France on 20 August 1944.

References

Sources

1936 ships
Ships built in Bremen (state)
Fishing vessels of Germany
Steamships of Germany
Auxiliary ships of the Kriegsmarine
Maritime incidents in August 1944
Shipwrecks in the Bay of Biscay